New Forest is a civil parish in the Richmondshire district of North Yorkshire, England.

There is no village in the parish.  It consists mainly of grouse moor, and the isolated farms of Helwith, Holgate, Kexwith, and Kersey Green.  The population of the parish is estimated at 10.

In Norman times the New Forest was a hunting forest, held by the Earls of Richmond together with the forest of Arkengarthdale to the west.  In the Middle Ages there were lead mines and coal mines in the forest.  It was a township in the large ancient parish of Kirkby Ravensworth until 1866, when it became a separate civil parish.

The civil parish now shares a grouped parish council with the civil parish of Marske, known as Marske & New Forest Parish Council.

References 

Civil parishes in North Yorkshire
Richmondshire